Agaricomycetidae is a subclass of fungi, in the division Basidiomycota.  The name Agaricomycetidae had previously been named by Marcel Locquin in 1984, but his publication did not contain a Latin diagnosis and it is therefore invalid under the International Code of Nomenclature for algae, fungi, and plants. It was subsequently validly published by Erast Parmasto in 1986.

References

External links

Systema Naturae 2000: Agaricomycetidae

Agaricomycetes
Lichen subclasses